Corey Enright (born 14 September 1981) is a former professional Australian rules footballer who played for the Geelong Football Club in the Australian Football League (AFL). Enright is currently defence coach at St Kilda, after coaching at Geelong from 2017 to 2020.

Early life
Enright grew up in the town of Kimba, South Australia and played for the Kimba District Tigers in the Eastern Eyre Football League. He was recruited from the Port Adelaide Magpies, selected by Geelong with the 47th overall pick in the 1999 National Draft.

Playing career
Like many of his teammates, Enright was outstanding in 2007. He was among the Cats best in the Grand Final win over Port Adelaide, gathering 29 possessions.

The 2008 season saw Enright become a household name with his first All-Australian selection.  He was again pivotal in the Grand Final, recording 25 disposals in the Cats' 26-point loss to Hawthorn.

In 2009 after another superb season down back, Enright got his second All-Australian team selection, this time starting on the field. Enright was also voted by his peers to be the league's most underrated player, as he had begun to make a name for himself as one of the league's most reliable non-key defenders with his superb overhead skills and cool, calm head.

2010 saw a third successive selection in the All-Australian team in which he followed up with a fourth successive selection in 2011, the last three selections as a starting back pocket.

At Geelong Corey also won his two Club Best and Fairest "Carji Greeves" Medals in the Premiership Years 2009 and 2011.

Enright joins an elite AFL group who have won multiple club best and fairest medals in premiership years. This group includes Leigh Matthews, Kevin Bartlett, Jason Dunstall, Simon Black, Michael Voss and Josh Gibson.

On the night of the 2011 Carji Greeves Medal presentation, coach Chris Scott introduced Corey Enright as "still the most underrated player in the competition".

Enright made Geelong history after overtaking the previous record of 325 games held by Ian Nankervis in round 19, 2016 against the Western Bulldogs at Simonds Stadium. On 3 September 2021, in the Cats' semi-final against , his record was overtaken by Joel Selwood.

After the conclusion of the 2016 season, Enright announced his retirement from the AFL.

Statistics

|-
|- style="background-color: #EAEAEA"
! scope="row" style="text-align:center" | 2001
|
| 44 || 17 || 5 || 5 || 116 || 87 || 203 || 56 || 20 || 0.3 || 0.3 || 6.8 || 5.1 || 11.9 || 3.3 || 1.2
|-
! scope="row" style="text-align:center" | 2002
|
| 44 || 16 || 3 || 2 || 180 || 117 || 297 || 54 || 27 || 0.2 || 0.1 || 11.3 || 7.3 || 18.6 || 3.4 || 1.7
|- style="background-color: #EAEAEA"
! scope="row" style="text-align:center" | 2003
|
| 44 || 22 || 3 || 6 || 240 || 174 || 414 || 117 || 40 || 0.1 || 0.3 || 10.9 || 7.9 || 18.8 || 5.3 || 1.8
|-
! scope="row" style="text-align:center" | 2004
|
| 44 || 9 || 0 || 1 || 67 || 41 || 108 || 27 || 15 || 0.0 || 0.1 || 7.4 || 4.6 || 12.0 || 3.0 || 1.7
|- style="background-color: #EAEAEA"
! scope="row" style="text-align:center" | 2005
|
| 44 || 15 || 8 || 6 || 168 || 109 || 277 || 79 || 23 || 0.5 || 0.4 || 11.2 || 7.3 || 18.5 || 5.3 || 1.5
|-
! scope="row" style="text-align:center" | 2006
|
| 44 || 22 || 11 || 2 || 327 || 164 || 491 || 139 || 64 || 0.5 || 0.1 || 14.9 || 7.5 || 22.3 || 6.3 || 2.9
|- style="background-color: #EAEAEA"
! scope="row" style="text-align:center" | 2007
|
| 44 || 24 || 9 || 5 || 323 || 226 || 549 || 139 || 51 || 0.4 || 0.2 || 13.5 || 9.4 || 22.9 || 5.8 || 2.1
|-
! scope="row" style="text-align:center" | 2008
|
| 44 || 25 || 6 || 2 || 299 || 282 || 581 || 133 || 70 || 0.2 || 0.1 || 12.0 || 11.3 || 23.2 || 5.3 || 2.8
|- style="background-color: #EAEAEA"
! scope="row" style="text-align:center" | 2009
|
| 44 || 25 || 4 || 2 || 343 || 285 || 628 || 142 || 71 || 0.2 || 0.1 || 13.7 || 11.4 || 25.1 || 5.7 || 2.8
|-
! scope="row" style="text-align:center" | 2010
|
| 44 || 24 || 1 || 1 || 360 || 222 || 582 || 136 || 69 || 0.0 || 0.0 || 15.0 || 9.3 || 24.3 || 5.7 || 2.9
|- style="background-color: #EAEAEA"
! scope="row" style="text-align:center" | 2011
|
| 44 || 23 || 1 || 0 || 330 || 183 || 513 || 144 || 64 || 0.0 || 0.0 || 14.3 || 8.0 || 22.3 || 6.3 || 2.8
|-
! scope="row" style="text-align:center" | 2012
|
| 44 || 22 || 2 || 3 || 283 || 179 || 462 || 126 || 53 || 0.1 || 0.1 || 12.9 || 8.1 || 21.0 || 5.7 || 2.4
|- style="background-color: #EAEAEA"
! scope="row" style="text-align:center" | 2013
|
| 44 || 22 || 1 || 4 || 324 || 166 || 490 || 152 || 41 || 0.0 || 0.2 || 14.7 || 7.5 || 22.3 || 6.9 || 1.9
|-
! scope="row" style="text-align:center" | 2014
|
| 44 || 22 || 8 || 4 || 255 || 207 || 462 || 114 || 61 || 0.4 || 0.2 || 11.6 || 9.4 || 21.0 || 5.2 || 2.8
|- style="background-color: #EAEAEA"
! scope="row" style="text-align:center" | 2015
|
| 44 || 21 || 0 || 1 || 301 || 183 || 484 || 148 || 60 || 0.0 || 0.0 || 14.3 || 8.7 || 23.0 || 7.0 || 2.9
|-
! scope="row" style="text-align:center" | 2016
|
| 44 || 23 || 4 || 2 || 322 || 220 || 542 || 130 || 66 || 0.2 || 0.1 || 14.0 || 9.6 || 23.6 || 5.6 || 2.9
|- class="sortbottom"
! colspan=3| Career
! 332
! 66
! 46
! 4238
! 2845
! 7003
! 1836
! 795
! 0.2
! 0.1
! 12.8
! 8.6
! 21.3
! 5.5
! 2.4
|}

Coaching career
Enright joined Geelong's coaching team for the 2017 season, beginning as a development coach before becoming an assistant coach and helping Geelong reach finals in each year of his tenure. Ahead of the 2022 season, Enright joined St Kilda as an assistant coach.

References

External links

Geelong Football Club players
Geelong Football Club Premiership players
Port Adelaide Magpies players
Australian rules footballers from South Australia
Carji Greeves Medal winners
All-Australians (AFL)
1981 births
Living people
Three-time VFL/AFL Premiership players